The 2013 National Invitation Tournament was a single-elimination tournament of 32 NCAA Division I teams that were not selected to participate in the 2013 NCAA tournament. The annual tournament began on March 19 on campus sites and ended on April 4 at Madison Square Garden. Baylor defeated Iowa, 74–54, to capture the Bears its first NIT title in school history.

Participants

Automatic qualifiers
The following teams earned automatic berths into the 2013 NIT field by virtue of winning their conferences' regular season championship, but failing to win their conference tournament. These teams also did not receive an at-large bid for the NCAA Tournament.

At-large bids
The following 22 teams were also awarded NIT berths.

Seeds

Bracket
Games are played at Higher Seed unless noted

See also
 2013 Women's National Invitation Tournament
 2013 NCAA Division I men's basketball tournament
 2013 NCAA Division II men's basketball tournament
 2013 NCAA Division III men's basketball tournament
 2013 NCAA Division I women's basketball tournament
 2013 NCAA Division II women's basketball tournament
 2013 NCAA Division III women's basketball tournament
 2013 NAIA Division I men's basketball tournament
 2013 NAIA Division II men's basketball tournament
 2013 NAIA Division I women's basketball tournament
 2013 NAIA Division II women's basketball tournament
 2013 College Basketball Invitational
 2013 CollegeInsider.com Postseason Tournament

References

National Invitation
National Invitation Tournament
2010s in Manhattan
National Invitation Tournament
Basketball in New York City
College sports in New York City
Madison Square Garden
National Invitation Tournament
National Invitation Tournament
Sports competitions in New York City
Sports in Manhattan